is a public park in the Hikarigaoka and Asahichō regions of Nerima Ward and the Akatsuka-shinmachi region of Itabashi Ward, Tokyo, Japan. Over 98% of the park is in Nerima Ward, with the north-east corner being in Itabashi Ward. It is the seventh-largest park in Tokyo.

Facilities
Baseball fields (4)
Athletics field (400m track with dirt surface)
Tennis courts (8, artificial grass)
Monument 
Fountain
Day campground (reservation required)
BBQ open space (reservation required)
Gateball field
Youth soccer field
Kyūdō hall (Japanese/Western, 90m distance)
Bird sanctuary
Tennis practice wall
Open space for young children
Hikarigaoka Library
Hikarigaoka Gymnasium

Events
Hawarin-bayaru (meaning Spring Festival in Mongolian), one of Japan's largest events that introduces Mongolia, is held every year during Golden Week.

Access
By train:
 Toei Oedo Line: Hikarigaoka Station (8 minutes' walk)
 Tokyo Metro Yurakucho Line /  Fukutoshin Line: Chikatetsu-Akatsuka Station (13 minutes' walk)
  Tokyo Metro Yurakucho Line/  Fukutoshin Line: Chikatetsu-Narimasu Station (15 minutes' walk)

By bus:
From Narimasu Station on the Tobu Tojo Line, take the Seibu Bus (to Hikarigaoka Station) and get off at Hikarigaoka Park North (less than 1 minute's walk)

By car: Parking spaces: 234;  Price: 300 yen for 1 hour, 100 yen every 30 minutes thereafter

See also
 Parks and gardens in Tokyo
 National Parks of Japan

References

 tokyo-park.or.jp

External links
 gm2000.co.jp

Parks and gardens in Tokyo